Samiullah Khan was the governor of the Princely State of Sahaspur before partition of India.

Rule 
State of Sahaspur had 22 villages under its command in the current Bijnor district of Uttar Pradesh state of India.

Family

Daughters 
 Arghwani Begum (born 2nd January, 1922), she had two daughters (Nabahat and Sabahat) and a son.

See also
State of Sahaspur

Notes

Partition of India
Administrators in the princely states of India